Jürgen Schiller (born 18 August 1946) is a German former swimmer. He competed in the men's 200 metre individual medley at the 1968 Summer Olympics.

References

External links
 

1946 births
Living people
German male swimmers
Olympic swimmers of West Germany
Swimmers at the 1968 Summer Olympics
People from Rhön-Grabfeld
Sportspeople from Lower Franconia